A for Andromeda is a 2006 remake of the 1961 TV series of the same name by Fred Hoyle and John Elliot.

Plot
The plot centres on a group of scientists who detect a radio signal from another galaxy that contains instructions for the design of an advanced computer. When the computer is built, it gives the scientists instructions for the creation of a living organism named Andromeda, but one of the scientists, John Fleming, fears that Andromeda's purpose is to subjugate humanity.

Cast
 Tom Hardy as John Fleming
 Charlie Cox as Dennis Bridger
 Kelly Reilly as Christine Jones / Andromeda
 Jane Asher as Professor Madeleine Dawnay
 David Haig as General Vandenberg
 Colin Stinton as Kaufman

Production
The series was produced by Richard Fell, who the previous year had overseen The Quatermass Experiment, a live remake of the 1953 TV series of the same name, also largely absent from the BBC archives.

Talking about the decision to commission the remake, Fell said, "We thought A for Andromeda was too good an opportunity to miss... it is the obvious follow up [to The Quatermass Experiment]. It had a huge impact when it arrived. It's also lost to the TV archives and it was an amazing story and, like Quatermass, very forward looking". He added, "It raises themes about artificial intelligence, cloning, biological warfare and the political exploitation of science which are as important today as they were when it was written – if not more so. It is also a strange kind of love story, if a man can fall in love with a machine that is".

Fell also adapted Hoyle and Elliot's original teleplays; at 85 minutes, this new version was much shorter that the original which ran for almost 300 minutes. In condensing the script, Fell used considerably fewer characters and locations. This included resetting the location from a radio telescope to a signals intelligence ground station. Fell also merged several characters – for instance, Judy Adamson and Christine were merged into the character of Christine; the Madeline Dawnay character combined the roles of both the original Dawnay character and that of Rheinhart while General Vandenberg took on the role of many of the authority figures from the original.

Cast as Christine/Andromeda was Kelly Reilly. Fleming was played by Tom Hardy. Bridger was played by Charlie Cox and Vandenberg by David Haig. Dawnay was played by Jane Asher; Fell had hoped to be able to cast Julie Christie in this role as a nod to the original but the actress was unavailable. Directed by John Strickland, it was shot on location in early 2006 at Stanmore Air Base and the Brecon Beacons.

Reception
First broadcast on Monday, 27 March 2006 on BBC Four, it was watched by 580,000 viewers, making it the top rated programme on BBC Four for that week. Reviewing the production for the Independent on Sunday, Hermione Eyre said:

References

External links
 
 

BBC television dramas
Works by John Elliot (author)
Works by Fred Hoyle
2000s English-language films
British science fiction television films
2006 television films
2006 films
2000s British films